Zvi Lotker is an Israeli computer scientist and communications systems engineer who works in the fields of digital humanities, artificial intelligence, distributed computing, network algorithms, and communication networks. He is an associate professor in the Alexander Kofkin Faculty of Engineering at Bar-Ilan University.

In 2018, Lotker was awarded the SIROCCO Prize for Innovation in Distributed Computing for his contributions to network algorithms, but especially for his contributions to the field of social networks.

Lotker is the author of the book Analyzing Narratives in Social Networks (Springer, 2021).

He is the son of the Israeli painter .

Education 
Lotker obtained his Ph.D. from Tel Aviv University in 2003, writing his thesis "Algorithms in Networks" under the supervision of Boaz Patt-Shamir.

Research 
After receiving his doctorate, Lotker worked as a postdoctoral researcher at INRIA in Sophia Antipolis Mascot, France. During this time he also worked in the same capacity at the Max-Planck-Institut für Informatik in Germany. From 2004 to 2006, Lotker worked as a postdoctoral researcher at the Centrum voor Wiskunde en Informatica research group in the Netherlands. He joined the Ben-Gurion University of the Negev in Israel as a lecturer in 2006 before becoming an associate professor in 2012. In 2014, Lotker took a sabbatical and worked as a visiting professor in the Paris Diderot University in France. He has been employed as an associate professor by Bar-Ilan University in Israel since 2018, where he teaches optimization, advanced topics in social networks, basic python programming, topics in distributed computing, and data structure and algorithms.

Selected publications 

 Lotker, Z. (2021). Analyzing Narratives in Social Networks: Taking Turing to the Arts. Springer Nature.
 Avin, C., Keller, B., Lotker, Z., Mathieu, C., Peleg, D., & Pignolet, Y. A. (2015, January). Homophily and the glass ceiling effect in social networks. In Proceedings of the 2015 conference on innovations in theoretical computer science (pp. 41-50).
 Alon, N., Avin, C., Koucký, M., Kozma, G., Lotker, Z., & Tuttle, M. R. (2011). Many random walks are faster than one. Combinatorics, Probability and Computing, 20(4), 481-502.
 Avin, C., Koucký, M., & Lotker, Z. (2008, July). How to explore a fast-changing world (cover time of a simple random walk on evolving graphs). In International Colloquium on Automata, Languages, and Programming (pp. 121-132). Springer, Berlin, Heidelberg.
 Lotker, Z., Patt-Shamir, B., Pavlov, E., & Peleg, D. (2005). Minimum-weight spanning tree construction in O (log log n) communication rounds. SIAM Journal on Computing, 35(1), 120-131.
 Kesselman, A., Lotker, Z., Mansour, Y., Patt-Shamir, B., Schieber, B., & Sviridenko, M. (2004). Buffer overflow management in QoS switches. SIAM Journal on Computing, 33(3), 563-583.

References

External links 
 Home page
 

Tel Aviv University alumni
Israeli computer scientists
Year of birth missing (living people)
Living people
Academic staff of Ben-Gurion University of the Negev
Academic staff of Bar-Ilan University